Richard Heath (1831–1912) was an English journalist and author.

His articles on rural topics were published together in The English Peasant (1893), which was part of T. Fisher Unwin's "The Reformer's Bookshelf" series. The Times selected it as one of its "Books of the Week" and said Heath "was tolerably well known a couple of decades ago as an eloquent and persevering, if not always discriminating, champion of the agricultural labourer". They added that the book was written with a "vein of Christian Socialism".

Works
Edgar Quinet: His Early Life and Writings (1881).
Historic Landmarks in the Christian Centuries (1882).
The English Via Dolorosa; or, Glimpses of the History of the Agricultural Labourer (1884).
The Reformation in France: from the Dawn of Reform to the Revocation of the Edict of Nantes (1886).
The Reformation in France: from the Revocation of the Edict of Nantes to the incorporation of the Reformed Churches into the state (1888).
The English Peasant: Studies: Historical, Local, and Biographic (1893).
Anabaptism, from its rise at Zwickau to its fall at Münster 1521-1536 (1895).

Notes

Further reading
John Briggs, ‘Richard Heath, 1831–1912: From Suburban Baptist to Radical Discipleship by Way of Anabaptism’, in John Briggs and Anthony Cross (eds.), Freedom and the Powers: Perspectives from Baptist History Marking the 400th Anniversary of Thomas Helwys' the Mystery of Iniquity (Didcot: Baptist Historical Society, 2016), pp. 69–84.
Margaret Pease, Richard Heath: 1831–1912 (Letchworth: Garden City Press, 1922).

1831 births
1912 deaths
English journalists